Morelet's tree frog (Agalychnis moreletii), also known as black-eyed leaf frog and popeye hyla, is a species of frog in the subfamily Phyllomedusinae. It is found in Belize, El Salvador, Guatemala, Honduras, and Mexico.

Its natural habitats are subtropical or tropical moist lowland forest, subtropical or tropical moist montane forest, freshwater marshes, and intermittent freshwater marshes.

Description 
This is a frog that has a green body, black eyes, and a red or pink underbelly.

Distribution and habitat 
They are found in moist subtropical lowland mountainous forests and wetland habitats of Belize, El Salvador, Guatemala, Honduras, and Mexico. They have been collected on the Atlantic and Pacific slopes of Veracruz, Chiapas, the Maya mountains of Belize, northwestern Honduras, and El Salvador. They can live in pristine or disturbed habitats and will breed in temporary or permanent bodies of water.

Reproduction and lifecycle 
They have an extended breeding season during the summer months. When choosing a mate, the females tend to search for the males with the best sounding mating call. The males whose mating calls are the longest and have the most frequent pulses in pitch are the ones who get chosen by the females. They deposit clutches of 50 to 75 eggs on vegetation or rocks over water. The eggs of the Morelet's tree frog have a green pigment and when they hatch, the larvae fall into the water to complete their development into frogs.

Conservation 
Morelet's tree frog are abundant within its range and are kept as pets internationally. Industry and agriculture are thought to be the main causes of lowland montane forest destruction. The population of Morelet's tree frogs are also being affected due to a disease called Chytridiomycosis, which is an infectious disease that kills amphibians. Chytridiomycosis and habitat destruction are projected to cause the population to decline over 80% in the next 10 years. In some regions, the frogs have gone extinct completely. For example, a study done in 2004, has claimed that Morelet's tree frog may be extirpated from the region of Southern Mexico.

Their survival is dependent upon several factors due to their human and disease-caused population decline. Some conservation measures are in place, while others are still in need of implementation or research. Several protected parks have been created to curb habitat destruction in areas of Central America and Mexico. Taxonomic research is currently in place to further understand the population's status. More data are needed, however, on a temporal and spatial scale to determine trends in the population of Morelet's tree frogs.

References

Further reading

Lee, J.C. 1996. The Amphibians and Reptiles of the Yucatán Peninsula. Cornell University Press. Ithaca, New York, USA.
Duellman, W.E. 2001. The Hylid Frogs of Middle America. Society for the Study of Amphibians and Reptiles. Ithaca, New York, USA.

External links

https://web.archive.org/web/20080705031457/http://fwie.fw.vt.edu/WCS/020310.HTM
2006 IUCN Red List of Threatened Species.  Downloaded on 21 July 2007.
Image of a Morelet's treefrog

Agalychnis
Frogs of North America
Amphibians of Central America
Amphibians of Mexico
Amphibians of Belize
Amphibians of Guatemala
Critically endangered fauna of North America
Amphibians described in 1853
Taxa named by André Marie Constant Duméril
Taxonomy articles created by Polbot